Elmir Ramilevich Nabiullin (born 8 March 1995) is a Russian professional footballer of Tatar descent. He plays as a left-back for Rubin Kazan.

Club career
Nabiullin made his debut in the Russian Premier League on 9 March 2014 for FC Rubin Kazan in a game against FC Anzhi Makhachkala. His first coach was Renat Rashidovich Ibragimov.

On 15 February 2018, he signed a 4.5-year contract with Zenit St. Petersburg.

On 8 July 2019, he moved to the Russian Premier League newcomer PFC Sochi.

On 6 July 2021, he signed with Khimki. On 16 July 2022, Nabiullin's contract with Khimki was terminated by mutual consent.

On 15 August 2022, Nabiullin joined Pari NN on a two-year contract. Nabiullin was released by Pari NN on 10 February 2023.

International
Nabiullin made his debut for the Russia national football team on 31 March 2015 in a friendly game against Kazakhstan.

Honours
Zenit Saint Petersburg
Russian Premier League: 2018–19

Career statistics

Club

International

Statistics accurate as of match played 31 March 2015

External links

References

1995 births
Volga Tatar people
Tatar people of Russia
Tatar sportspeople
Footballers from Kazan
Living people
Russian footballers
Russia youth international footballers
Russia under-21 international footballers
Russia international footballers
Association football defenders
FC Rubin Kazan players
FC Zenit Saint Petersburg players
PFC Sochi players
FC Khimki players
FC Nizhny Novgorod (2015) players
Russian Premier League players